Xenopoclinus leprosus, the leprous platanna-klipfish, is a species of clinid found along the coast of South Africa from the Orange River to Algoa Bay. It can be found on substrates of sand, gravel, or pebbles.

References

External links
 Illustration

leprosus
Taxa named by J. L. B. Smith
Fish described in 1961